This is a list of works by John Wesley, a Christian cleric, theologian and evangelist, who founded the Methodist movement. Wesley produced hundreds of sermons, biblical commentaries, letters, tracts, treatises, and other works. As well as theology he wrote about music, marriage, medicine, abolitionism and politics. Wesley's prose, Works, were first collected by himself (32 vols., Bristol, 1771–74, frequently reprinted in editions varying greatly in the number of volumes). His chief prose works are a standard publication in seven octavo volumes of the Methodist Book Concern, New York. The Poetical Works of John and Charles, ed. G. Osborn, appeared in 13 vols., London, 1868–72.

1730s

1740s
 
 
 
 
  
 
 
 
 
 
 
 
 
 
  first edition, second edition, third edition
 
 
 
 
 
 
  
 
 
 
 
 
 
 
 
 
 
 
 
 
 
 
 
 
 
  1st edition, 2nd edition
 
 
  Volume I, Volume II, Volume III
 
  part I, part II, part III
 
 
 
 
 
 
 
 
 
 
 
 
 
 
 
 
 
 
  (4 vols.)

1750s
 
 
 
 
 
 
 
 
 
 
 
 
 
 
 
 
 
 
 
 
 
 
 
 
 
 
 
 
 
 
 
 
 
 
 
 
  (in reply to Dr. John Taylor of Norwich)

1760s
 
 
 
 
 
 
  first edition second edition

1770s
 
 
 
 
 
 
 
 
 
 
 
 
 
 
 
 
  (This edition has many errors) Volume I Volume II Volume III Volume IV Volume V Volume VI Volume VII Volume VIII Volume IX Volume X Volume XI Volume XII Volume XIII Volume XIV Volume XV Volume XVI Volume XVII Volume XVIII Volume XIX Volume XX Volume XXI Volume XXII Volume XXIII Volume XXIV Volume XXV Volume XXVI Volume XXVII Volume XXVIII Volume XXIX Volume XXX Volume XXXI Volume XXXII
 
 
 
 
 
 
 
 
 
 
 
 
 
 
   
 
 
 
 
 
 
 
 
 
 
 
 
 
 
 
 
 
 
  Volume I Volume II Volume III Volume IV
 
 
 
 
 
 
 
 
 
 
 
 
 
 
 
 
 
 
 
 
  1778 1779 1780 1781 1782 1783 1784 1785 1786 1787 1788 1789 1790 1791

1780s
 
 
 
 
 
 
 
 
 
 
  Volume I Volume II

1790s

Posthumous
  (This is better than the preceding, but is still very erroneus.) Volume I Volume III Volume IV Volume V Volume VI Volume VII Volume VIII Volume IX Volume X Volume XI Volume XII Volume XIII Volume XIV Volume XV Volume XVI Volume XVII
  (At present, the standard edition.)
  (in seven volumes, combining two volumes of the Jackson Edition into one. Containing two extra letters and more footnotes.) Volume I Volume II Volume III Volume IV Volume V Volume VI Volume VII
  (in 15 volumes the Jackson Edition with an additional volume containing his Notes to the New Testament)
 
  (originally published in 20 parts) Volume I Volume II Volume III Volume IV Volume V Volume VI Volume VII Volume VIII Volume IX Volume X Volume XI Volume XII Volume XIII
  (containing notes from unpublished diaries) Volume I Volume II Volume III Volume IV  Volume V Volume VI Volume VII Volume VIII
  (containing notes from unpublished diaries)

See also
Sermons of John Wesley

Source
The Works of John and Charles Wesley – a bibliography, containing an exact account of all the publications issued by the Wesleys, arranged in chronological order, with a list of the early editions, and descriptive and illustrative notes

Frank Baker's Catalogue - a more comprehensive catalogue of Wesley's Works

External links

Christian bibliographies
Bibliographies by writer